The 100 Greatest Films of Argentine Cinema (Spanish: Las 100 mejores películas del cine argentino), also known as the Survey of Argentine cinema (Spanish: Encuesta de cine argentino), are a series of opinion polls carried out to establish a list of the greatest films of Argentine cinema of all time. The original survey was carried out by the Museo del Cine Pablo Ducrós Hicken in the years 1977, 1984, 1991 and 2000. In 2022, a new edition was held, organized by the film magazines La vida útil, Taipei and La tierra quema, with support from INCAA, the Mar del Plata International Film Festival, the FestiFreak International Film Festival of La Plata, the Casa de la Cultura of General Roca and the Museo del Cine Pablo Ducrós Hicken.

In the 1977 and 1984 lists, Prisioneros de la tierra (1939) by Mario Soffici reached first place, while Crónica de un niño solo (1965) by Leonardo Favio was the most voted in 2000. In the 2022 survey, the first place went to La Ciénaga (2001) by Lucrecia Martel by a wide margin. The 2022 list generated debate regarding the need for a national Cinematheque (a longtime demand of the local film community), since the difficult or non-existent access to many works from the past greatly affected the result.

Surveys by the Museo del Cine Pablo Ducrós Hicken
The original surveys were carried out by the Museo del Cine Pablo Ducrós Hicken in Buenos Aires in the years 1977, 1984, 1991 and 2000. The results of the last survey were published in the 4th issue of La mirada cautiva, the museum's magazine, which also included the top ten from the 1977 and 1984 polls.

Survey of 2022

Development
In 2022, the film magazines La vida útil, Taipei and La tierra quema decided to carry out a new survey inspired by the previous ones. In the editorial accompanying the list, they stated: "When members of our magazines found out about their existence, almost simultaneously and through different channels, we immediately thought it would be a good idea to carry out a new version of the survey." The project was carried out with the support of INCAA, the Mar del Plata International Film Festival, the FestiFreak International Film Festival of La Plata, the Casa de la Cultura of General Roca and the Museo del Cine Pablo Ducrós Hicken.

Various critics, journalists, researchers, historians, programmers, collectors, directors, screenwriters, producers, actors, cinematographers, editors and sound engineers, among other film-related jobs, participated in the 2022 survey. More than 1,000 invitations were sent, of which 546 responses were obtained, including 812 different titles; each participant chose their 10 favorite Argentine films, of any year and length, with all of them having the same value at the time of counting. Due to the coincidences in the number of votes, 62 ranking positions were formed, and the "Top 100" actually consists of 103 films divided into 52 positions.

The results of the Encuesta de cine argentino 2022 (English: "2022 Survey of Argentine cinema") were presented at the 37th Mar del Plata International Film Festival on 11 November 2022. During the presentation of the list, Paula Félix-Didier, director of the Museo del Cine Pablo Ducrós Hicken, declared that the "survey has the specific and explicit idea of developing a canon of Argentine cinema and serves to discuss, open doors and draw attention about some things." The first place went to La Ciénaga (2001) by Lucrecia Martel by a wide margin.

Analysis and criticism
The official editorial that accompanied the publication of the survey—signed by La vida útil, Taipei and La tierra quema—threw a series of reflections:
Between the last edition and the current one, twenty-two years passed, the longest amount of time without the survey taking place. In these last two decades, there have been important transformations, both structural and aesthetic, in Argentine cinema. We believe that this is a particularly interesting moment to update, after the emergence and decline of the New Argentine Cinema, of which the previous survey showed its first steps by incorporating two key films among the most chosen: Mundo grúa and Pizza, birra, faso. In the following years, this paradigm shift was not only consolidated, but also gradually diluted and gave rise to a post-NCA, with more imprecise characteristics. These results aspire to be an input to build new hypotheses and global readings on the cinema of the last decades.

In the years between the two surveys there were also strong political and social transformations. The 2001 crisis, as well as the irruption of Kirchnerism, to name two key factors, have caused deep turbulence, including an increase in political discussion and commitment. We believe that this could be linked, for example, with the appearance of a Raymundo Gleyzer film, absent from any previous list, among the 15 most selected. In the same way, we find an increasing presence of documentaries, both among the ten most voted and in the general results. In summary, there are multiple factors and variables that intervene in the results and that make up a list in which symptoms of a diverse nature are expressed and in which different tendencies coexist —sometimes in conflict.

Finally, we would like to point out that the number of times that, in the responses of those surveyed, the idea appears that if there were a national film archive, their answers would be radically different. We believe that the absence of state policies to protect our national heritage, the poor conditions in which a vast number of copies survive (in the cases where they still exist), the difficult or non-existent access to many films and the advantage of the most recent cinema in terms of material conditions for exhibition have affected the result. That is why we feel it is important to thank the people, festivals and institutions that, with minimal resources, make sure that we can see Argentine cinema in the best possible quality. Had it not been for them, many films would probably not have had such a strong presence in the survey.

In an essay published in Con los ojos abiertos, Nicolás Prividera—director of Adiós a la memoria (2020), which is part of the "Top 100"——celebrated the existence of the survey but criticized both the execution and the result. Regarding the making of the list, he opined:
Let's go then to the key to the mistake: "Each participant was asked for a list of their ten favorite Argentine films (...) with the aim of reaching the hundred best". From this inconsistency between request and objective derives a basic problem: This list cannot be read or evaluated as a possible canon, nor as a mere indication of the taste of an era. Probably the result would have been different if they had chosen between "best" or "preferred", or in any case make two lists or surveys to see the difference... As it turned out, for example, Esperando la carroza has more votes than Prisioneros de la tierra, without it being clear how to evaluate or think about this result: Is it proposed as one of the "good" ones, or is its place in popular memory only assumed?

(...) In short, what the survey does not make clear is whether the result (what seems to be left over or missing) responds to what Williams called "selective tradition", or simply to a lack of knowledge of the history of Argentine cinema.

(...) The fact that the list of voters is so wide could help at least to have a statistic, if the criteria had been even. But here "the Bible and the water heater" are notoriously mixed: I am referring to the results, not to the voters (although some assume in their social media that they voted without having full knowledge), since prejudices vanish when seeing the unusual choices of notorious connoisseurs of Argentine cinema, who have at least a panoramic vision of their field. Surprises abound, in the best and worst sense ...

(...) This also proves that it would have been good to establish some clear rules, given the number of participants who have the impudence to vote for themselves, their partners, or the films they were part of. Although we suspect that not even an express request would have been able to avoid the elective affinities (not to say cronyism) that prevails in these cases. The problem is that with such a wide dispersion of votes (in which only 11 votes are enough to get a place among the "100") every vote counts and some more or less expected agreements may affect the results.

Another problem is the number of films to choose from: some mention less than 10, and others obviously could or would like to mention many more. Probably the result would also have been different if we had been able to add other films to each list, which would have given more votes to many of those that were lost (a good part of the set had only one vote) and ensured a higher position to others (although without the distinction between "best" and "favorites" perhaps the confusion would not have varied much).

Regarding the results, Prividera wrote:
Let's start with the numerical finding, to see if we can interpret it in any way. The editors note that "more than half of the top 100 films had not appeared in previous surveys, and about a third of those 100 were released after 2000". Many of the others (such as Los tallos amargos or No abras nunca esa puerta) respond notoriously to the recent diffusion of their restorations, not precisely due to a local initiative, but which shows the potential that the existence and operation of a National Cinematheque could have, beyond its primary function of preservation.

(...) Leonardo Favio (...) got five titles in the Top 20. This is not curious, given that he is usually one of the few filmmakers that everyone mentions with reverence (although finding his influence is more difficult). Nor is the preference for his films from the 1960s, which can be more easily related to the New Argentine Cinema of the 1990s, the notorious new addition to this survey, not only in terms of films but also in terms of voters.

(...) There are notorious incorporations and exclusions, promotions and also notable decreases. In relation to the 2000 survey: Camila went from position 2 to 27, La historia oficial from 8 to 35, La Patagonia rebelde from 3 to 30, Rosaura a las diez from 4 to 23, La guerra gaucha from 7 to 77 , to name just a few cases. But among the 100 there is also much of the previously despised "80s cinema": Not only Esperando la carroza or Tiempo de revancha (it is in the well-deserved top five) but previously invisible films like Juan, como si nada hubiera sucedido or Habeas Corpus, which show that if that decade was not prodigious at least it was richer than what its haters propose.

(...) Another striking result is the, on the contrary, welcome presence of experimental cinema, although the one that achieved a position among the 100 is Ofrenda, by Claudio Caldini.

(...) It also happens, if we talk about injustices, that there are filmmakers mentioned only for one film, who have other equally considerable films, such as Romero (Tres anclados en París), [Gerardo] Vallejo (Reflexiones de un salvaje) or [Carlos] Echeverría (Cuarentena), just to name a few great films about exile. Thus, it is to be hoped that, in addition to the ups and downs, future votes will find films that did not get a single vote in this one. To mention just a few notable films from the 70's: El habilitado (a film that can dialogue with [Ana] Poliak's cinema), La Hora de María y el pájaro de oro (a class-conscious Nazareno) and Los miedos (which our numerous genre cultors ignore).

In short: let's hope that the survey serves to see, above all, what is missing. But don't wait for the increasingly distant Cinematheque.. We will never have a complete retrospective of Christensen, Saslavsky or Torre Nilsson, in stupendous restored copies, like any country in the world with the (in)visible tradition of Argentine cinema. It will be necessary to continue depending on the little will of INCAA (which is nothing but the result of the little will of the industry), and on the tireless activity of archivists such as Fernando Martín Peña (without whom neither Juan nor Los traidores would have come to the fore in this list), and of course on the selfless or resigned cinephiles who share their best copies wherever they can or they are left...

Results

The top 10 positions in the 1977 and 1984 polls, as well as the top 100 in the 2000 poll, were published in 4th issue of La mirada cautiva, the magazine of the Museo del Cine Pablo Ducrós Hicken.

Top 10 of 1977

Top 10 of 1984

Top 100 of 2000

Due to the coincidences in the number of votes, the list of the 100 greatest films actually consists of 101 films divided into 43 positions.

Top 100 of 2022

Due to the coincidences in the number of votes, the "Top 100" of the Encuesta de cine argentino 2022 actually consists of 103 films divided into 52 positions. The total list has 812 titles and 62 ranking positions, belonging to the latter all the titles that had only one vote.

See also

 Latin American cinema
 List of films considered the best

References

External links
 Encuesta de cine argentino 2022 (in Spanish), official website

Top film lists
Lists of Argentine films